Sara H. Cody, M.D., is an American doctor, epidemiologist and public health official serving as the health officer and public health director of Santa Clara County, California, at the time of the 2020 COVID-19 outbreak. Cody continues to maintain a regular presence in the media to communicate COVID-19 news and policy.

Education
Cody graduated from Stanford University, receiving a degree in human biology, and subsequently completing her Doctor of Medicine at Yale School of Medicine. Following an internship and residency in internal medicine at Stanford University Medical Center, Cody completed a two-year fellowship in epidemiology and public health, as an Epidemic Intelligence Service (EIS) officer ("disease detective") with the Centers for Disease Control and Prevention.

Career
During her fellowship as an EIS officer, she investigated the 1996 international outbreak of E. coli O157:H7 that was linked to unpasteurized Odwalla apple juice, which killed a 16-month-old girl and sickened 70 people, of whom 25 were hospitalized and 14 developed the hemolytic uremic syndrome. She also led an investigation into a salmonella outbreak in Santa Clara County that was traced to cheese made from raw milk and sold in local Hispanic markets. After completion of this fellowship, Cody joined the Public Health Department of Santa Clara County. In 1998, she became the deputy health officer for the county. In this role she oversaw surveillance and investigation of 83 reportable diseases, conducted investigations on outbreaks, and responded to SARS, H1N1 and other public health emergencies.
In the years after the September 11 attacks, Cody worked with the then-county health officer Marty Fenstersheib to model Santa Clara County's emergency response to a bioterrorism attack or pandemic. This model included such measures as social distancing, shutting schools and at its most extreme, stay-at-home orders. In 2013, Cody moved into the role of county health officer. In 2015, she was also appointed director of the Santa Clara County Public Health Department and has since maintained the dual role.

COVID-19 outbreak

Along with other public health officers in the region, Cody was largely credited for promptly advocating for measures that would limit the spread of COVID-19 when the pandemic reached the United States in 2020. She led the Santa Clara County Public Health Department to establish an incident command center on January 23, three days after the first confirmed case in the country, then established a contact tracing mechanism in an effort to stop the propagation of the disease. 
Cody issued the first guidelines on the closure and cancelation of public gatherings on March 3, extending them to sporting events, festivals and bars on March 9. She was an early advocate of requiring residents to "shelter-in-place", which was put in effect on March 16 in seven counties of the Bay area, with California Governor Gavin Newsom adopting that policy for the whole state three days later.

Cody explained that "If you are going to do something really drastic like shelter-in-place, you want to do it as early as you possibly can. Because if you wait to do it, you get all the harms, all of the social and economic disruptions, but you miss a lot of the benefit."

Cody has made regular appearances on Bay Area press and video conferences, explaining county health policy and reminding residents that the COVID-19 battle is a long-term health concern: "Because we flattened the curve, it doesn’t mean that we are done. Because we are far, far, far from done." In a press conference in April, Cody confirmed that the first United States COVID-19 death had actually occurred in the Bay Area on February 6, some 23 days prior to the previously known first death. This was the first of three early COVID-19 deaths, which Cody described as "iceberg tips", suggesting that there was a vast and unseen propagation. Following one news conference, she became the subject of a viral meme, after she implored citizens to refrain from touching their faces, then licked her finger to turn a page.

Cody received threats from residents unhappy with the drastic nature the measures put in place. In late August, the Santa Clara County Sheriff's Office announced that they had arrested a man suspected of sending her several threatening letters, which used language typical of far-right movements. Police found 138 firearms at his residence. Charged with stalking and threatening a public official, he remained in jail while waiting for court proceedings. The police maintain 24-hour protection around Cody.

Criticism 
On several occasions Cody has cited the effectiveness of the enacted mandates, without providing data or evidence to back up her claims. The mandates were set without any exit metrics to be tracked. On one occasion, Cody cited masks as the reason why Santa Clara county had minimal influenza cases in the winter of 2021, while not mentioning the entire area was under shelter in place at that time, with only essential businesses open, and without mentioning that many places throughout the world which had no mask mandates had no influenza cases either.

Personal life
Cody is a resident of Palo Alto.

References

American physicians
Living people
People from Palo Alto, California
American women epidemiologists
American epidemiologists
Stanford University alumni
Yale School of Medicine alumni
COVID-19 pandemic in California
Government of Santa Clara County, California
Centers for Disease Control and Prevention people
Year of birth missing (living people)